"Forever Your Girl" is a song by American singer and choreographer Paula Abdul from her 1988 eponymous debut studio album. Written and produced by Oliver Leiber, who also produced her previous single "(It's Just) The Way that You Love Me", the single version was released on February 20, 1989, by Virgin Records. Following the unexpected success of "Straight Up", the song continued Abdul's newfound commercial success, becoming her second chart-topper on the Billboard Hot 100 for two consecutive weeks.

"Forever Your Girl" spent two weeks at the top of the US Billboard Hot 100 in May 1989, reached number 28 on the Dance Club Songs chart, and number 11 on the Adult Contemporary chart.

Composition and lyrics

The song is about loyalty in a relationship. The female vocalist proclaims that, despite rumors that others may be interested in her, none of those matter because she will remain faithful to the man she loves; she will remain "forever his girl." The single version differs slightly from the album version, as it uses more of the background male vocal featuring the Wild Pair, Bruce DeShazer, and Marvin Gunn.

Critical reception
Eleanor Levy left ironically negative review on this single for British music newspaper Record Mirror. She called it "a disappointingly predictable pop song".

Music video
The accompanying music video for the song was directed by David Fincher, and features Abdul acting as a choreographer and director of a children's performance. A young Elijah Wood appears in the video, playing the kid in the suit.

Charts

Weekly charts

Year-end charts

Certifications

Cover versions
The 2020 film Impractical Jokers: The Movie, the plot of which revolves around a party with Paula Abdul, includes the original version by Abdul, a live version, and cover versions by Bon Jovi, Method Man, Harry Connick Jr. and Joey Fatone.

References

1988 songs
1989 singles
Paula Abdul songs
Billboard Hot 100 number-one singles
RPM Top Singles number-one singles
Music videos directed by David Fincher
Songs written by Oliver Leiber
Virgin Records singles